Sanjabad-e Gharbi Rural District is in the Central District of Kowsar County, Ardabil province, Iran. At the census of 2006, its population was 9,025 in 1,859 households; there were 8,090 inhabitants in 2,168 households at the following census of 2011; and in the most recent census of 2016, the population of the rural district was 6,881 in 2,055 households. The largest of its 38 villages was Ganjgah, with 685 people.

References 

Kowsar County

Rural Districts of Ardabil Province

Populated places in Ardabil Province

Populated places in Kowsar County